The Village is an SiriusXM channel that specializes in folk music, described by SiriusXM as "from the ballads of early American songwriters to the contemporary masters of folk." Originally on XM Satellite Radio channel 62, it is now available on SiriusXM internet radio, channel 741. The program director of The Village is Mary Sue Twohy.  The channel was added to XM Radio Canada on April 1, 2007 as part of XM Radio Canada simulcasting the American service.

Background
The Village Folk Show, hosted by Mary Sue Twohy, airs on The Bridge ch 17, 6:00 - 10:00 AM ET every Sunday and regularly features guest artist performances, interviews, guest host programming and new releases. Mary Chapin Carpenter, Donovan, Art Garfunkel, Kathy Mattea, Steve Earle, Sylvia Tyson, The Chapin Family and more have been featured on the show.

Artists that are on the playlist include Tom Paxton, Judy Collins, Peter, Paul and Mary, Bob Dylan, Pete Seeger, and Joni Mitchell.  The Village also carries special programs such as John McEuen's Acoustic Traveller.

The Village and host MarySue Twohy won a Gracie Award in 2016 from the Alliance for Women in Media Foundation (AWMF).

As of April 2009 its logo has changed from the word "village" in green lowercase print to the word in black type and Capital letters. Also lines are drawn on the "V" and lines drawn on the letters "l,l,a,g and e". The letter "I" is a  guitar.

References

External links
 

XM Satellite Radio channels
Digital-only radio stations
Sirius XM Radio channels